Sucre is a town and municipality in the Cauca Department, Colombia.It contains roughly 10,00 households. As of 2013, the municipality is frequently hit by FARC attacks.

 

Municipalities of Cauca Department